Harold Bell (22 November 1924 – 17 July 1994) was an English footballer who holds the record for the most consecutive appearances for a British football team.

Bell was picked for Tranmere Rovers in the first game after World War II in the 1946–47 season and did not miss a match until he was dropped on 30 August 1955, a total of 401 consecutive league matches for the team in Football League Third Division North. He also played in 26 FA Cup matches, 22 Liverpool Senior Cup and 10 Cheshire Bowl games, making a grand total of 459 appearances. In total he made 633 appearances, finally leaving the club for Holyhead Town in 1959.

See also
List of footballers in England by number of league appearances (500+)

References

1924 births
1994 deaths
English footballers
Tranmere Rovers F.C. players
English Football League players
Footballers from Liverpool
Association football central defenders